Hurrell is a surname. Notable people with the surname include:

Andrew Hurrell, British political scientist and academic
Frederick Charles Hurrell (1928-2008), Director-General of the RAF Medical Services from 1986 to 1988
 Graham Hurrell (born 1975), English badminton player
George Hurrell (1904–1992), American photographer
Jack Hurrell (1931-2003), Welsh rugby union player
John Hurrell (born 1947), English cricketer
Konrad Hurrell (born 1991), Tongan rugby league player
Will Hurrell (born 1990), English rugby union player
William Hurrell (1860–1952), British Anglican priest
Willie Hurrell (1920–1999), Scottish footballer